Illiberis may refer to:

 , a.k.a. Iliberris, Illiberi Liberini, ancient name for Granada
 Illiberis, a.k.a. Illibere, ancient name for Elne
 Illiberis (moth), a genus of moths in the family Zygaenidae

See also 
 Elimberri, a.k.a. Auch
 Elumberris, a.k.a. Lombez
 Concilium Eliberritanum, a.k.a. Synod of Elvira.